Marian Wyrzykowski (1904-1970) was a Polish theater actor.

1904 births
1970 deaths
Polish male actors
20th-century Polish male actors
Recipient of the Meritorious Activist of Culture badge